Adena or Adeena is a female given name

Adeena Karasick (born 1965), Canadian poet, performance artist, and essayist
Adena (musician), Romanian singer-songwriter
Adena Friedman (born 1969), American businessperson
Adena Halpern (born 1968), American author
Adena Jacobs (born 1982), Australian theatre director
Adena Williams Loston (born 1952), American college president

See also

Adina (given name)

Feminine given names